The 2019 St Kilda Football Club season was the 123th in the club's history. Coached by Alan Richardson and captained by Jarryn Geary, they competed in the AFL's 2019 Toyota Premiership Season.

2018 off-season list changes

Retirements and delistings

Trades

National draft

Rookie draft

Pre-season supplemental selection period

Mid-season draft

Squad

Season summary

Pre-season

Regular season

Ladder

References

External links
 
 Listing of St Kilda game results in 2019

St Kilda Football Club seasons
St Kilda